Elin Kristiansen (born 9 July 1968) is a former biathlete from Norway. She won two individual World Championships medals, one in 1988 when she won silver at the 10 km event and a bronze in 1990 from the sprint event. Her best Winter Olympic Games placing came in the 1994 Winter Olympics, when she finished fourth in the relay event, and her best individual placing was ninth, from the individual at the Olympic games 1992 in Albertville.

References
 
 
 

1968 births
Living people
Norwegian female biathletes
Biathletes at the 1994 Winter Olympics
Biathlon World Championships medalists
20th-century Norwegian women